Bethania railway station is located on the Beenleigh line in Queensland, Australia. It serves the suburb of Bethania in City of Logan. Immediately south of the station, the Beaudesert line branches off.

History
Bethania station opened in July 1885 as Kara Kara. In September that year, it became a junction station when the Beaudesert railway line opened and was renamed Bethania Junction. It resumed its original name in 1943. Refreshment rooms opened in 1908 and closed in 1964. On 21 April 1992, a third platform opened as part of the duplication of the line.

Services
Bethania station is served by all stops Beenleigh line services from Beenleigh to Bowen Hills and Ferny Grove.

Services by platform

References

External links

Bethania station Queensland's Railways on the Internet
[ Bethania station] TransLink travel information

Railway stations in Logan City
Railway stations in Australia opened in 1885